3,3-Bis(chloromethyl)oxetane (BCMO) is a useful monomer in the field of energetic materials for synthesis of poly(bis(azidomethyl)oxetane (PolyBAMO), which is being researched by numerous militaries around the world. Poly-BAMO is an energetic polymer that have potential to replace the current propellant binder formulations.

It is classified as an extremely hazardous substance in the United States as defined in Section 302 of the Emergency Planning and Community Right-to-Know Act (42 U.S.C. 11002), and is subject to strict reporting requirements by facilities which produce, store, or use it in significant quantities. It can cause kidney damage, lacrimation, and somnolence if consumed.

Preparation and reaction 
BCMO is formed in solution via cyclization of pentaerythritol trichlorohydrin with a non-organic base like sodium hydroxide.

BAMO can be formed from a reaction of BCMO with sodium azide. This reaction takes place in an alkaline solution with tetrabutyl ammonium bromide, which acts as a phrase transfer catalyst.

References

Oxetanes
Organochlorides

Cyclic compounds